Ishtar Music, Previously known as Venus Records & Tapes is an Indian record label company, originally founded by Ganesh Jain and Ratan Jain as Venus Music in 1988 and currently a subsidiary of Believe Digital. It is primarily known for publishing and marketing Bollywood music soundtracks and Indi-pop music. Venus Music has recently been renamed to Ishtar Music.

Soundtrack discography

Hindi

Tamil

Manmadan Ambu
Vaanam
Siruthai
Kaavalan
Pesu

YouTube presence
Venus Records & Tapes joined YouTube on 22 September 2005, and has around 35.9 million subscribers as of February 2022.

References

Record label distributors
Record labels established in 1988
Indian companies established in 1988
Indian music record labels
YouTube channels launched in 2005
Music-related YouTube channels